Gompholobium capitatum, commonly known as yellow pea, is a species of flowering plant in the family Fabaceae and is endemic to the south-west of Western Australia. It a slender, erect or ascending shrub with pinnate leaves and yellow flowers.

Description
Flowering occurs from September to December and the fruit is a flattened pod.

Taxonomy
Gompholobium capitatum was first formally described in 1832 by Allan Cunningham in Edwards's Botanical Register from specimens raised by Joseph Knight in London from seed collected by William Baxter near King George Sound. The specific epithet (capitatum) means "capitate", referring to the flowers.

Distribution and habitat
Yellow pea grows in sandy soil in heath and forest in the Esperance Plains, Jarrah Forest, Swan Coastal Plain and Warren biogeographic regions of south-western Western Australia.

Conservation status
This pea is classified as "not threatened" by the Western Australian Government Department of Parks and Wildlife.

References

capitatum
Eudicots of Western Australia
Plants described in 1832
Taxa named by Allan Cunningham (botanist)